Gabilan may refer to:
Gabilan, an eagle ray found in the Gulf of California
Gabilan, California, a former settlement in Monterey County, California
Gabilan Range, mountains in California
Gabilan Mountains slender salamander (Batrachoseps gavilanensis), a species of salamander 
USS Gabilan (SS-252), a United States Navy Gato-class submarine

See also
Gabilan Acres, California, an unincorporated community in Monterey County, California